"Our Town" is the debut single by Canadian country music band Cold Creek County. It was written by Todd Clark and Gavin Slate. It was released in April 2015 via Sony Music Canada.

Commercial performance
The song debuted at No. 42 on the Billboard Canada Country charts on May 23, 2015. It was the most added song to Canadian country radio. It reached the Top Ten in June 2015.

Music video
The official music video for "Our Town" premiered on June 12, 2015.

Charts

References

2015 songs
Cold Creek County songs
2015 debut singles
Songs written by Todd Clark
Songs written by Gavin Slate